The Boston Society of Film Critics Award for Best Director is an annual film award given by the Boston Society of Film Critics.

Winners

1980s

1990s

2000s

2010s

2020s

Multiple wins
 3 – Martin Scorsese, Steven Spielberg
 2 – Kathryn Bigelow, David Lynch, Roman Polanski, Ang Lee

References

Boston Society of Film Critics Awards
Awards for best director